Ner is a census town and tehsil in Darwha subdivision of Yavatmal district  in the state of Maharashtra, India. As per 2011 census population of Ner was around 90,000. 

The famous Shri Fakirji Maharaj yatra (fair) is held in Ner tehsil. Famous landmarks in Ner include a Ganesha temple named 'Shree Ganpati Math', a Someshwar temple, a Jama Masjid, an Agricultural produce market committee and a cotton market.

References

Cities and towns in Yavatmal district
Talukas in Maharashtra